Natalie Titcume (born 6 December 1975 in Sydney) is a softball player from Australia, who won a bronze medal 2000 Sydney Olympics, a silver medal at the 2004 Athens Olympics and bronze at the 2008 Beijing Olympics. She plays catcher and 3rd base.

References 
 Victorian Institute of Sport profile

1975 births
Living people
Australian softball players
Olympic softball players of Australia
Olympic silver medalists for Australia
Olympic bronze medalists for Australia
Olympic medalists in softball
Medalists at the 2000 Summer Olympics
Medalists at the 2004 Summer Olympics
Medalists at the 2008 Summer Olympics
Softball players at the 1996 Summer Olympics
Softball players at the 2000 Summer Olympics
Softball players at the 2004 Summer Olympics
Softball players at the 2008 Summer Olympics
Sportswomen from New South Wales
Sportspeople from Sydney